Leandro Ismael Paris Jimenez (born 16 February 1995) is an Argentine middle-distance runner competing primarily in the 800 metres. He represented his country in the 800 metres at the 2017 World Championships narrowly missing the semifinals. Additionally, he has won several medals at regional level.

International competitions

Personal bests

Outdoor
400 metres – 47.93 (Fresno 2017)
800 metres – 1:47.09 (London 2017)

References

1995 births
Living people
Argentine male middle-distance runners
World Athletics Championships athletes for Argentina
Athletes (track and field) at the 2018 South American Games
South American Games bronze medalists for Argentina
South American Games medalists in athletics